Guido Gallese (born 18 March 1962) is the bishop of Alessandria della Paglia since his appointment was announced on 20 October 2012. He had previously served as director of the Diocesan Office for the university and head of diocesan youth ministry.

He was appointed bishop-elect of Alessandria by Pope Benedict XVI with the announcement being made on 20 October 2012. The diocese had been vacant since September 2011 when then-Bishop Giuseppe Versaldi was appointed president of the Prefecture of the Economic Affairs of the Holy See. As per the norms of canon law Gallese must be ordained and installed within four months of his appointment.

He was raised to the episcopate on Sunday 11 November, and was installed and took possession of the see on 25 November.

References

Living people
21st-century Italian Roman Catholic bishops
Pontifical University of the Holy Cross alumni
1962 births